Illinois Route 115 is a minor north–south state route in northeastern Illinois. It runs from Illinois Route 9 near Perdueville to the concurrent U.S. Routes 45/52 in Kankakee.

Route description 

Illinois 115 is a north–south highway from Perdueville to Buckingham; at Buckingham, it turns east but is still marked north–south. South of Kankakee, Illinois 115 turns north again on its way into Kankakee.

Illinois 115 is an undivided two-lane surface state route for its entire length.

History 
SBI Route 115 ran from near Kankakee to Perdueville along what is Illinois 115 now. In 1954, when U.S. 45 was moved onto a new road, Illinois 115 was extended north into Kankakee onto old U.S. 45.

Major Intersections

References

External links

115
U.S. Route 45
Transportation in Ford County, Illinois
Transportation in Kankakee County, Illinois